This is a complete chronological listing of the minor premiers of the VFA/VFL. This minor premiership is the title which is won by the team finishing on top of the ladder at the end of the home-and-away season in the Victorian Football League (known as the Victorian Football Association until 1995).

Criteria
The team which finishes with the best record across the home-and-away season is awarded the minor premiership. This is determined by most premiership points, with four points for a win and two points for a draw; if tied, percentage (ratio of points scored to points conceded) is used as tie-breaker.

The minor premiership is distinct from the major premiership (or, simply, the premiership), which is awarded to the winner of the finals series which follows the home-and-away season. The VFA first established a finals series in 1903, and hence the first distinct minor premiership is recognised in that season.

List of minor premiers
The following is a list of minor premiers, ladder details and results.

Division 1

Notes

Source where unlisted

Division 2

Notes

Source

Minor premiership wins

See also
List of VFA/VFL premiers

References

Victorian Football League
VFA VFL minor premiers